The Arzakan-Meghradzor Sanctuary is a protected area in the Armenian Kotayk Province. The sanctuary covers an area of 135.32 km² in the Hrazdan forest. It has a protection level of 4 according to the IUCN protection system.

The sanctuary protects mountain forests consisting mainly of oak trees. This environment forms a valuable habitat for animals like the brown bear, roe deer and the caucasian black grouse.

References

Geography of Armenia
Protected areas of Armenia